Paul Kazuo Kuroda (1 April 1917 – 16 April 2001), was a Japanese-American chemist and nuclear scientist.

Life 
He was born on April 1, 1917 in Fukuoka Prefecture, Japan.

He died on April 16, 2001 at his home in Las Vegas, Nevada.

Career 
He received bachelors and doctoral degrees from the Imperial University of Tokyo. He studied under Professor Kenjiro Kimura.

His first paper was published in 1935. He focused mostly on radio and cosmochemistry, and most of his 40 papers published prior to 1944 are about the chemistry of hot springs. In 1944, he became the youngest faculty member of the Imperial University of Tokyo, and after World War II, despite the ban on radiochemistry in Japan, he continued to study radiochemistry until 1949.

On arrival to the United States in 1949, he met with nuclear chemist, Glenn Seaborg. He became an Assistant Professor of Chemistry at the University of Arkansas in 1952, becoming a US citizen in 1955.

In 1956, Kuroda was the first to propose that natural self-sustaining nuclear chain reactions were possible. Such a reactor was discovered in September 1972 in the Oklo Mines of Gabon.

He became the first Edgar Wertheim Distinguished Professor of Chemistry in 1979, he officially retired from the University of Arkansas in 1987.

Honours 
He is the winner of the Pure Chemistry Prize.

References

External links 
 http://www.encyclopediaofarkansas.net/encyclopedia/entry-detail.aspx?entryID=6619

1917 births
2001 deaths
People from Fukuoka Prefecture
University of Tokyo alumni
Nuclear chemists
Japanese emigrants to the United States
University of Arkansas faculty
American academics of Japanese descent